Mindanao is the second-largest island of the Philippines. Mindanao may also refer to:

Mindanao River, on the island of Mindanao
Battle of Mindanao, a World War II battle on the island
Mindanao island group: Mindanao plus other islands nearby
USS Mindanao, three U.S. Navy ships

See also

Maguindanao (disambiguation)